The Babylonian captivity or Babylonian exile is the period in Jewish history during which a large number of Judeans from the ancient Kingdom of Judah were captives in Babylon, the capital city of the Neo-Babylonian Empire, following their defeat in the Jewish–Babylonian War and the destruction of Solomon's Temple in Jerusalem. The event is described in the Hebrew Bible, and its historicity is supported by archaeological and extra-biblical evidence.

After the Battle of Carchemish in 605 BCE, the Babylonian king Nebuchadnezzar II besieged Jerusalem, which resulted in tribute being paid by the Judean king Jehoiakim. In the fourth year of Nebuchadnezzar II's reign, Jehoiakim refused to pay further tribute, which led to another siege of the city in Nebuchadnezzar II's seventh year (598/597 BCE) that culminated in the death of Jehoiakim and the exile to Babylonia of his successor Jeconiah, his court, and many others; Jeconiah's successor Zedekiah and others were exiled when Nebuchadnezzar II destroyed Jerusalem in his 18th year (587 BCE), and a later deportation occurred in Nebuchadnezzar II's 23rd year (582 BCE). However, the dates, numbers of deportations, and numbers of deportees vary in the several biblical accounts.

After the fall of the Neo-Babylonian Empire to the Achaemenid Persian Empire and its founding king Cyrus the Great at the Battle of Opis in 539 BCE, exiled Judeans were permitted by the Persians to return to Judah. All of these events are considered significant to the developed history and culture of the Jewish people, and ultimately had a far-reaching impact on the development of Judaism.

Archaeological studies have revealed that, although the city of Jerusalem was utterly destroyed, other parts of Judah continued to be inhabited during the period of the exile. Most of the exiled did not return to their homeland, instead travelling westward and northward. Many settled in what is now northern Israel, Lebanon, and Syria. The Iraqi Jewish, Persian Jewish, Georgian Jewish, and Bukharan Jewish communities are believed to derive their ancestry in large part from these exiles; these communities have now largely immigrated to Israel.

Biblical accounts of the exile 

In the late 7th century BCE, the Kingdom of Judah was a client state of the Assyrian empire. In the last decades of the century, Assyria was overthrown by Babylon, an Assyrian province. Egypt, fearing the sudden rise of the Neo-Babylonian empire, seized control of Assyrian territory up to the Euphrates river in Syria, but Babylon counter-attacked. In the process Josiah, the king of Judah, was killed in a battle with the Egyptians at the Battle of Megiddo (609 BCE).

After the defeat of Pharaoh Necho's army by the Babylonians at Carchemish in 605 BCE, Jehoiakim began paying tribute to Nebuchadnezzar II of Babylon. Some of the young nobility of Judah were taken to Babylon.

In the following years, the court of Jerusalem was divided into two parties, one supporting Egypt, the other Babylon. After Nebuchadnezzar was defeated in battle in 601 BCE by Egypt, Judah revolted against Babylon, culminating in a three-month siege of Jerusalem beginning in late 598 BCE. Jehoiakim, the king of Judah, died during the siege and was succeeded by his son Jehoiachin (also called Jeconiah) at the age of eighteen. The city fell on 2 Adar (March 16) 597 BCE, and Nebuchadnezzar pillaged Jerusalem and its Temple and took Jeconiah, his court and other prominent citizens (including the prophet Ezekiel) back to Babylon. Jehoiakim's uncle Zedekiah was appointed king in his place, but the exiles in Babylon continued to consider Jeconiah as their Exilarch, or rightful ruler.

Despite warnings by Jeremiah and others of the pro-Babylonian party, Zedekiah revolted against Babylon and entered into an alliance with Pharaoh Hophra. Nebuchadnezzar returned, defeated the Egyptians, and again besieged Jerusalem, resulting in the city's destruction in 587 BCE. Nebuchadnezzar destroyed the city wall and the Temple, together with the houses of the most important citizens. Zedekiah and his sons were captured and the sons were executed in front of Zedekiah, who was then blinded and taken to Babylon with many others (Jer 52:10–11). Judah became a Babylonian province, called Yehud, putting an end to the independent Kingdom of Judah (Because of the missing years in the Jewish calendar, rabbinic sources place the date of the destruction of the First Temple at 3338 AM (423 BCE) or 3358 AM (403 BCE)).

The first governor appointed by Babylon was Gedaliah, a native Judahite; he encouraged the many Jews who had fled to surrounding countries such as Moab, Ammon and Edom to return, and he took steps to return the country to prosperity. Some time later, a surviving member of the royal family assassinated Gedaliah and his Babylonian advisors, prompting many refugees to seek safety in Egypt. By the end of the second decade of the 6th century BCE, in addition to those who remained in Judah, there were significant Jewish communities in Babylon and in Egypt; this was the beginning of the later numerous Jewish communities living permanently outside Judah in the Jewish Diaspora.

According to the book of Ezra, the Persian Cyrus the Great ended the exile in 538 BCE, the year after he captured Babylon. The exile ended with the return under Zerubbabel the Prince (so-called because he was a descendant of the royal line of David) and Joshua the Priest (a descendant of the line of the former High Priests of the Temple) and their construction of the Second Temple in the period 521–516 BCE.

Archaeological and other extra-biblical evidence

First campaign (597 BCE)
Nebuchadnezzar's siege of Jerusalem, his capture of King Jeconiah, his appointment of Zedekiah in his place, and the plundering of the city in 597 BCE are corroborated by a passage in the Babylonian Chronicles:In the seventh year, in the month of Kislev, the king of Akkad mustered his troops, marched to the Hatti-land, and encamped against the City of Judah and on the ninth day of the month of Adar he seized the city and captured the king. He appointed there a king of his own choice and taking heavy tribute brought it back to Babylon.

Jehoiachin's Rations Tablets, describing ration orders for a captive King of Judah, identified with King Jeconiah, have been discovered during excavations in Babylon, in the royal archives of Nebuchadnezzar. One of the tablets refers to food rations for "Ya’u-kīnu, king of the land of Yahudu" and five royal princes, his sons.

Second campaign (589–587 BCE)
Nebuchadnezzar and the Babylonian forces returned in 589 BCE and rampaged through Judah, leaving clear archaeological evidence of destruction in many towns and settlements there. Clay ostraca from this period, referred to as the Lachish letters, were discovered during excavations; one, which was probably written to the commander at Lachish from an outlying base, describes how the signal fires from nearby towns were disappearing: "And may (my lord) be apprised that we are watching for the fire signals of Lachish according to all the signs which my lord has given, because we cannot see Azeqah." Archaeological finds from Jerusalem testify that virtually the whole city within the walls was burnt to rubble in 587 BCE and utterly destroyed.

Aftermath in Judah
Archaeological excavations and surveys have enabled the population of Judah before the Babylonian destruction to be calculated with a high degree of confidence to have been approximately 75,000. Taking the different biblical numbers of exiles at their highest, 20,000, this would mean that only about 25% of the population had been deported to Babylon, with the remaining 75% staying in Judah. Although Jerusalem was destroyed and depopulated, with large parts of the city remaining in ruins for 150 years, numerous other settlements in Judah continued to be inhabited, with no signs of disruption visible in archaeological studies.

Archaeologist Avraham Faust states that between the deportations and executions caused by the Babylonians, plus the famines and epidemics that occurred during the war, the population of Judah was reduced to barely a 10% of what it had been in the time before deportations.

Persian restoration
The Cyrus Cylinder, an ancient tablet on which is written a declaration in the name of Cyrus referring to restoration of temples and repatriation of exiled peoples, has often been taken as corroboration of the authenticity of the biblical decrees attributed to Cyrus, but other scholars point out that the cylinder's text is specific to Babylon and Mesopotamia and makes no mention of Judah or Jerusalem. Professor Lester L. Grabbe asserted that the "alleged decree of Cyrus" regarding Judah, "cannot be considered authentic", but that there was a "general policy of allowing deportees to return and to re-establish cult sites". He also stated that archaeology suggests that the return was a "trickle" taking place over decades, rather than a single event.

As part of the Persian Empire, the former Kingdom of Judah became the province of Judah (Yehud Medinata) with different borders, covering a smaller territory. The population of the province was greatly reduced from that of the kingdom, archaeological surveys showing a population of around 30,000 people in the 5th to 4th centuries BCE.

A 2017 exhibition in Jerusalem displayed over 100 cuneiform tablets detailing trade in fruits and other commodities, taxes, debts, and credits accumulated between Jews forced or persuaded to move from Jerusalem by King Nebuchadnezzar around 600 BCE. The tablets included details on one exiled Judean family over four generations, all with Hebrew names.

Exilic literature 

The exilic period was a rich one for Hebrew literature. Biblical depictions of the exile include Book of Jeremiah 39–43 (which saw the exile as a lost opportunity); the final section of 2 Kings (which portrays it as the temporary end of history); 2 Chronicles (in which the exile is the "Sabbath of the land"); and the opening chapters of Ezra, which records its end. Other works from or about the exile include the stories in Daniel 1–6, Susanna, Bel and the Dragon, the "Story of the Three Youths" (1 Esdras 3:1–5:6), and the books of Tobit and Book of Judith. The Book of Lamentations arose from the Babylonian captivity. The final redaction of the Pentateuch took place in the Persian period following the exile,and the Priestly source, one of its main sources, is primarily a product of the post-exilic period when the former Kingdom of Judah had become the Persian province of Yehud.

Significance in Jewish history

In the Hebrew Bible, the captivity in Babylon is presented as a punishment for idolatry and disobedience to Yahweh in a similar way to the presentation of Israelite slavery in Egypt followed by deliverance. The Babylonian captivity had a number of serious effects on Judaism and Jewish culture. For example, the current Hebrew alphabet was adopted during this period, replacing the Paleo-Hebrew alphabet.

This period saw the last high point of biblical prophecy in the person of Ezekiel, followed by the emergence of the central role of the Torah in Jewish life. According to many historical-critical scholars, the Torah was redacted during this time, and began to be regarded as the authoritative text for Jews. This period saw their transformation into an ethno-religious group who could survive without a central Temple. Israeli philosopher and Biblical scholar Yehezkel Kaufmann said "The exile is the watershed. With the exile, the religion of Israel comes to an end and Judaism begins."

This process coincided with the emergence of scribes and sages as Jewish leaders (see Ezra). Prior to exile, the people of Israel had been organized according to tribe. Afterwards, they were organized by smaller family groups. Only the Tribe of Levi continued in its temple role after the return. After this time, there were always sizable numbers of Jews living outside Eretz Israel; thus, it also marks the beginning of the "Jewish diaspora", unless this is considered to have begun with the Assyrian captivity of Israel.

In Rabbinic literature, Babylon was one of a number of metaphors for the Jewish diaspora. Most frequently the term "Babylon" meant the diaspora prior to the destruction of the Second Temple. The post-destruction term for the Jewish Diaspora was "Rome", or "Edom".

Chronology 
The following table is based on Rainer Albertz's work on Israel in exile. (Alternative dates are possible.)

See also

 Avignon Papacy, sometimes called the "Babylonian Captivity of the Papacy"
 Al-Yahudu Tablets, 200 clay tablets from the sixth and fifth centuries BCE on the exiled Judean community
 Biblical Egypt
 Return to Zion, biblical account of the return to Judah by some of the exiled Juhadites
 Psalm 137, expressing lamentation of the exiles in Babylon for the loss of Jerusalem

References

Further reading

 Yehud Medinata map, CET – Center For Educational technology
 Yehud Medinata Border map, CET – Center For Educational technology
 Peter R. Ackroyd, "Exile and Restoration: A Study of Hebrew Thought of the Sixth Century B.C." (SCM Press, 1968)
 Rainer Albertz, Bob Becking, "Yahwism after the Exile" Van Gorcum, 2003)
 Blenkinsopp, Joseph, "Judaism, the first phase: the place of Ezra and Nehemiah in the origins of Judaism" (Eerdmans, 2009)
 Nodet, Étienne, "A search for the origins of Judaism: from Joshua to the Mishnah" (Sheffield Academic Press, 1999, original edition Editions du Cerf, 1997)
 Becking, Bob, and Korpel, Marjo Christina Annette (eds), "The Crisis of Israelite Religion: Transformation of Religious Tradition in Exilic & Post-Exilic Times" (Brill, 1999)
 Bedford, Peter Ross, "Temple restoration in early Achaemenid Judah" (Brill, 2001)
 Berquist, Jon L., "Approaching Yehud: new approaches to the study of the Persian period" (Society of Biblical Literature, 2007)
 Grabbe, Lester L., "A history of the Jews and Judaism in the Second Temple Period", vol.1 (T&T Clark International, 2004)
 Levine, Lee I., "Jerusalem: portrait of the city in the second Temple period (538 B.C.E.-70 C.E.)" (Jewish Publication Society, 2002)
 Lipschitz, Oded, "The Fall and Rise of Jerusalem" (Eisenbrauns, 2005)
 Lipschitz, Oded, and Oeming, Manfred (eds), "Judah and the Judeans in the Persian period" (Eisenbrauns, 2006)
 Middlemas, Jill Anne, "The troubles of templeless Judah" (Oxford University Press, 2005)
 Stackert, Jeffrey, "Rewriting the Torah: literary revision in Deuteronomy and the holiness code" (Mohr Siebeck, 2007)
 Vanderkam, James, "An introduction to early Judaism" (Eerdmans, 2001)

 
 
 

 
Ancient Jewish Persian history
Babylonia
Books of Chronicles
Books of Kings
Book of Jeremiah
Expulsions of Jews
Jewish Babylonian history
Jewish Iraqi history
Kingdom of Judah
Second Temple